Plyos is a rural locality (a khutor) in Arzhanovskoye Rural Settlement, Alexeyevsky District, Volgograd Oblast, Russia. The population was 12 as of 2010.

Geography 
Plyos is located on the right bank of the Khopyor River, 44 km southeast of Alexeyevskaya (the district's administrative centre) by road. Zotovskaya is the nearest rural locality.

References 

Rural localities in Alexeyevsky District, Volgograd Oblast